Penrhos is a village and former civil parish in the Welsh county of Gwynedd, located on the Llŷn Peninsula. The parish was abolished in 1934, and incorporated into Llannor.

It was the home of former MP Goronwy Roberts. Penyberth lies within its confines.

References

Villages in Gwynedd
Llannor